Ain Aouda secret prison is a suspected black site, torture and detention centre operated by the Directorate for the Surveillance of the Territory (Direction de la surveillance du territoire, DST), the Moroccan domestic intelligence agency implicated in past and ongoing human rights violations.

During the Arab Spring protests, the inmates of the Temara interrogation centre were transferred to Ain Aouda.
The United States reportedly paid the Moroccan state $20 million for the building of the prison.

See also
Tazmamart
Temara interrogation centre

References

External links
 Suspected location of the prison as it appears on Google maps

Prisons in Morocco
Human rights abuses in Morocco
Black sites
Torture in Morocco
2000s establishments in Morocco